Jason Christopher Bergmann (born September 25, 1981) is an American former professional baseball pitcher. He was born in Neptune Township, New Jersey, and grew up in Manalapan Township, New Jersey where he played high school baseball at Manalapan High School. In college, he played for Rutgers University.

Career

2006 season
Bergmann began the  season pitching at the Triple-A level at the Nationals' affiliate, the New Orleans Zephyrs, but was called up after the Nationals traded Liván Hernández to the Arizona Diamondbacks.

2007 season
In , he was converted from a reliever to a starting pitcher by the Nationals. After a disastrous first game (in which he allowed 4 runs on 5 hits and 6 walks in 3⅔ innings), he pitched very well, posting a combined 2.41 ERA over his subsequent six starts, three times pitching six or more innings and allowing two or fewer hits, but, mostly due to lack of run support, no wins.

Finally, on May 14, against the Atlanta Braves Bergmann pitched a gem: he struck out five of the first six batters he faced, pitching seven no-hit innings, and finishing with 8+ innings pitched, allowing just 2 hits, one run, 10 K's, and one walk. It was his first win of the season, and the first win as a starter in his career. By the end of the game, opponents were hitting .162 against Bergmann, best in the Majors. After the game, however, he complained of elbow soreness, was put on the 15-day DL, and ended up missing a month, returning on June 26 (throwing four innings, four hits, one run against the Braves).

For the 2007 season as a whole, Bergmann accrued a win-loss record of 6-6 and a 4.45 ERA, striking out 86 batters and walking 42 over 115⅓ innings.

During the 2007- off-season, Bergmann pitched for Tigres del Licey in the Dominican Winter Baseball League. In his four starts, he pitched a total of 19⅓ innings, compiling a 1–0 record and a 3.72 ERA, while striking out 11 batters and walking 3.

2008 season
Bergmann suffered a disappointing season with a 2–11 record and 5.09 ERA due in part to the extremely poor Nationals lineup. At the start of the season Bergmann was quickly sent down in the April to the Columbus Clippers. There he earned the International League Pitcher of the Week. Bergmann was then brought back to the majors and experienced some immediate success including 19 2/3 straight scoreless innings on the mound. Unfortunately the Nationals (the MLB's worst hitting team) performed especially poorly with Bergmann on the mound, scoring only 3.1 runs per game in support in total, only 2.4 of which were scored during the time he was pitching . Of his 22 starts, 10 were quality, yet the team was only able to convert 5 to wins, with 3 quality starts being blown by the bullpen.

2009 season
Bergmann opened the season with the Triple-A Syracuse Chiefs. He pitched 23.1 innings there, going 1–1 with a 1.16 ERA. He would later be recalled and went 2–4 in 48 innings with a 4.50 earned run average as a part of the 59-103 last-place Nationals.

2011 season 
On December 3, 2010, Bergmann signed a minor league contract with the Boston Red Sox, but the deal was voided on March 12, 2011, after he showed up to Spring Training with a shoulder issue. He was signed to a minor league contract by the Oakland Athletics on June 1, and assigned to the Double-A Midland RockHounds.

2012 season
He later signed with the Camden Riversharks of the Atlantic League for the 2012 season. Bergmann had a 0.81 ERA for Camden until June 20, when he was signed by the Colorado Rockies. The right-hander yielded a 6.98 ERA and a WHIP close to 2.00 in 40 innings over 28 appearances in the minors.

2013 season
Bergmann became the Sugar Land Skeeters' closer after working as a set-up man for Camden previously. He made 30 relief appearances for the team and in just his second season with the Atlantic League, he was named an All-Star. The right-hander held a 2–0 record with a 0.30 ERA (1ER/30IP) and a team-best 18 saves in as many opportunities. His 18 saves also ranked second in the Atlantic League. On July 5, 2013, the Skeeters sold his contract to Kansas City Royals.

References

External links

1981 births
Living people
Major League Baseball pitchers
Baseball players from New Jersey
Vermont Expos players
Savannah Sand Gnats players
Brevard County Manatees players
Harrisburg Senators players
New Orleans Zephyrs players
Gulf Coast Nationals players
Columbus Clippers players
Syracuse Chiefs players
Midland RockHounds players
Camden Riversharks players
Colorado Springs Sky Sox players
Sugar Land Skeeters players
Northwest Arkansas Naturals players
Washington Nationals players
Manalapan High School alumni
People from Manalapan Township, New Jersey
People from Neptune Township, New Jersey
Rutgers Scarlet Knights baseball players
Leones del Escogido players
American expatriate baseball players in the Dominican Republic
Peoria Javelinas players
Sportspeople from Monmouth County, New Jersey